Holmul River may refer to:
 Holmul River (Guatemala), a river in northeastern Guatemala, upper tributary of the Rio Bravo
 Holmul River (Romania), a river in Romania, tributary of the  Tazlăul Sărat

See also
Holmul (disambiguation)